Josephine Horton (born 17 November 1968) is a British judoka. She competed in the women's half-heavyweight event at the 1992 Summer Olympics. She became champion of Great Britain, winning the light heavyweight division at the British Judo Championships in 1990.

References

External links
 

1968 births
Living people
British female judoka
Olympic judoka of Great Britain
Judoka at the 1992 Summer Olympics
People from Croydon